Changathipoocha is a 2007 Malayalam language romantic comedy film directed by debutant S. P. Mahesh, stars Jayasurya and Radhika in the lead roles.

Plot
Changathipoocha tells the story of two aged brothers Sreedharan Nair, who is also the Kunnathur Panchayath President and Raman Nair, the opposition leader who are constantly at loggerheads owing differences in opinion regarding ancestral property. Raman Nair is also known as 'Kuliru', because he always goes out without wearing shirt. But everyone else in their family, including Sreedharan Nair's daughter Priya and Raman Nair's daughter Sreedevi are close to each other, sharing every part of their family fun. The news about the return of their sister Bhanumathi, who had been away for years, creates shock to Raman Nair especially because Bhanumathi's share of the property is at present under his control and even the house he is living in rightfully belongs to her.

The other news to follow was that Bhanumathi's son on their way back proposes to marry one of his cousins, Priya or Sreedevi. Raman Nair expects that if Bhanumathi's son marries Priya, Sreedharan Nair's daughter, he would be losing all the wealth. So with the aid of Purushottaman Nair, who is Raman Nair's manager, they come up with a solution. They plans the entry of someone else as a hired lover who could be made to fall in love with Priya and thus to create more tension for Sreedharan Nair, even before the arrival of Bhanumathi and her son.

According to this deed arrives Sivankutty, who is entrusted with the job of making Priya fall in love with him, so that Raman Nair could score a victory over Sreedharan Nair. Sivan is actually the brother-in-law of Purushottaman Nair and owes a large amount of money to many people, who are constantly after him. Sivankutty takes up the 'job' to solve his financial problems. A mix-up takes place as Sivan who was to fall in love with Priya, accidentally falls for Sridevi.

In the end, after a series of comic confusions, Sivankutty marries Sridevi.

Cast

Jayasurya as Sivankutty
Radhika as Sridevi
Ramya Nambeeshan  as Priya
Jagathy Sreekumar as Raman Nair
Nedumudi Venu as Sreedharan Nair
Salim Kumar as Rajappan
Sudheesh as Kunjunni
Kochu Preman as Purushottaman Nair
Cochin Haneefa
Harisree Ashokan as Aishwaryan
Joemon Joshy as Jayasurya's Brother
Manka Mahesh as Priya's mother
Ambika Mohan as Thankamani, Sridevi's mother
Geetha Nair as Sivankutty's mother
Ponnamma Babu
Seema G. Nair as  Janu / Tea shop owner

Soundtrack

The music of Changathipoocha is given by Ouseppachan. The lyrics are by Gireesh Puthenchery.
The film has two songs. The singers are Jayachandran, M. G. Sreekumar, Vineeth Sreenivasan and Manjari.

References

External links
 

2000s Malayalam-language films
2007 romantic comedy films
2007 directorial debut films
2007 films
Indian romantic comedy films
Films scored by Ouseppachan
Films shot in Thrissur